Orthodes goodelli, or Goodell's arches moth, is a species of cutworm or dart moth in the family Noctuidae.

The MONA or Hodges number for Orthodes goodelli is 10289.

References

Further reading

External links

 

Eriopygini
Articles created by Qbugbot
Moths described in 1875